Edward Joseph Pleasant (born December 17, 1988) is a former American football safety. He was signed by the Houston Texans as an undrafted free agent in 2012. He played college football at Oregon.

Professional career

Houston Texans
Pleasant was signed by the Houston Texans as an undrafted free agent on May 14, 2012. He was released on August 31, 2012 and was signed to the practice squad the next day. He was signed to the active roster on December 21, 2012.

Pleasant re-signed with the Texans on April 1, 2015.

From 2015 to 2017, Pleasant was a leader on special teams and provided depth as a backup strong safety.

New England Patriots
On July 24, 2018, Pleasant signed with the New England Patriots. He was released on August 26, 2018.

Arizona Cardinals
On October 20, 2018, Pleasant signed with the Arizona Cardinals. He was released on November 13, 2018.

Green Bay Packers
On November 28, 2018, Pleasant was signed by the Green Bay Packers.

NFL career statistics

Regular season

References

External links
Houston Texans biography
Oregon Ducks biography

1988 births
Living people
Players of American football from Compton, California
American football safeties
Oregon Ducks football players
Houston Texans players
New England Patriots players
Arizona Cardinals players
Green Bay Packers players